William Charles Storm Fewster (born 31 July 2003) is an English footballer who plays as a midfielder for Scunthorpe United on loan from Nottingham Forest of the Premier League.

Early life
Fewster played as a youngster with Pickering Town joining at under-8 level and captaining their under-11 team.

Career
Fewster was on the books at Leeds United before joining Nottingham Forest in the summer of 2021.
He made the Forest first team squad for an EFL Cup win at Grimsby Town at the start of the 2022-23 season. He made his first team debut on 7 January 2023 at Blackpool in the FA Cup, starting the game and playing 65 minutes before being substituted in Forest's 4–1 defeat at Bloomfield Road.

On 2 February 2023, it was announced that Fewster had joined National League side Scunthorpe United on loan for the remainder of the season.

Career statistics

Club
.

References

Living people
2003 births
English footballers
Nottingham Forest F.C. players
Scunthorpe United F.C. players
National League (English football) players